Bella Books is a small press publisher of lesbian literature based in Tallahassee, Florida.

History
Kelly Smith, along with other investors, created the corporation in Michigan in 1999 as an outgrowth of Smith's long relationship with A Woman's Prerogative Bookstore in Ferndale Michigan. Bella Books was named after a Jack Russell terrier who sat court at the bookstore. In 2004 Smith left the company and was replaced by the current chief executive officer Linda Hill, who is also the chief executive officer of Spinsters Ink and BeanPole Books. Hill moved the press to Tallahassee in 2005.

Since the publication of its first title in 2001, its primary focus has been on lesbian fiction. The press publishes lesbian romance, lesbian mystery and lesbian speculative fiction novels and lesbian erotica short-story anthologies. In 2003 it bought the backstock of Naiad Press, including the majority of the backlist for Jane Rule. In 2004, it bought the backstock of defunct Rising Tide Press. In 2005 it acquired distribution rights for New Victoria Press, including the works of Sarah Dreher. In 2008 it acquired reprint rights to the work of Ellen Hart. A typical production year includes 24-30 trade paperback releases as well as reprints of classic titles. Total titles in print exceed 300.

Titles first appearing in English-speaking markets are translated for distribution in France (KTM Editions, Editions Dans L'Engrenage), Germany (Verlag Krug), Spain (Egales) and the Czech Republic (LePress). Some titles are also acquired for hardcover editions by InsightOut Book Club, a division of the Quality Paperback Book Club.

By 2012 the biggest part of the business was in distribution for small feminist and LGBT publishers.

Awards
More than one hundred of its catalog titles have been shortlisted or have won Lambda Literary Awards or Golden Crown Literary Society Awards, and in 2004 it won the Lambda Literary Foundation's Independent LGBT Press Award.

Notable authors
Notable authors include: 

Rhiannon Argo
Nikki Baker
Jessie Chandler
Jeanne Córdova
Lea Daley
Katherine V. Forrest
Nancy Garden
Rachel Gold
Ellen Hart
Gerri Hill
Heather Rose Jones
Karin Kallmaker
Robbi McCoy
Claire McNab
Catherine Maiorisi
Joanne Passet
Emma Pérez
Diana Simmonds

Notes

References

Further reading

External links

Book publishing companies based in Florida
Feminism in Florida
Feminist book publishing companies
Lesbian feminist literature
Lesbian organizations in the United States
LGBT book publishing companies
LGBT in Florida
Publishing companies established in 2001
Small press publishing companies